Wilhelm Mauser (2 May 1834 – 13 January 1882) was a German weapon designer and manufacturer/industrialist.

Biography
Mauser was born in Oberndorf am Neckar, in what was then the Kingdom of Württemberg. His father and his four brothers were gunsmiths.

Together with his brother Paul Mauser (1838–1914) Wilhelm Mauser designed the Mauser Model 1871 rifle, the first of a successful line of Mauser rifles and pistols. The rifle was adopted as the Gewehr 71 or Infanterie-Gewehr 71 and was the first metal cartridge weapon of the German Empire. While Paul was the more technical of the two, Wilhelm handled this business side of the factory.

The Mauser company later developed the Gewehr 98 and Karabiner 98k rifle series. The Gewehr 98 itself is often considered the penultimate development of the line of Mauser rifles that were introduced in 1871.

References

External links
www.paul-mauser-archive.com: Paul Mauser archive web site by Mauro Baudino and Gerben van Vlimmeren.

1834 births
1882 deaths
Gunsmiths
Firearm designers
19th-century German inventors
People from the Kingdom of Württemberg
19th-century German businesspeople